Viktor Bopp (born 31 October 1989) is a former professional footballer who played as a midfielder. Born in Ukraine, he represented Germany at the youth level.

Personal life 
He is the younger brother of Eugen Bopp.

References

External links
 
 

1989 births
Living people
Ukrainian people of German descent
Ukrainian emigrants to Germany
Citizens of Germany through descent
German footballers
Association football midfielders
Germany youth international footballers
3. Liga players
FC Bayern Munich II players
Hannover 96 II players
R. Charleroi S.C. players
SV Wacker Burghausen players
Belgian Pro League players
Challenger Pro League players
German expatriate footballers
German expatriate sportspeople in Belgium
Expatriate footballers in Belgium
German people of Ukrainian descent